The 1990 Torneo Descentralizado, the top tier of Peruvian football was played by 44 teams in the format of Regional Tournament. The national champion was Universitario.

Regional I

Metropolitan

Central

North

Oriental

South

Octagonal

Liguilla Final

Regional II

Metropolitan

Central

North

Oriental

South

Octagonal

Liguilla Final

Extra match

Championship match

Title

External links
Peru 1990 season at RSSSF
Peruvian Football League News 

1990
Peru
Primera Division Peruana